Bariar  is a village in Bhulath tehsil in Kapurthala district of Punjab State, India. The village is administrated by a Sarpanch who is an elected representative.

Population data

List of cities near the village 
Bhulath
Kapurthala
Phagwara
Sultanpur Lodhi

Air travel connectivity 
The closest International airport to the village is Sri Guru Ram Dass Jee International Airport.

References

External links
 Villages in Kapurthala

Villages in Kapurthala district